Megachile antinorii is a species of bee in the family Megachilidae. It was described by Gribodo in 1879.

References

Antinorii
Insects described in 1879